"Generations of Love" is a song by British band Jesus Loves You, founded by singer Boy George, and was released as the second single from their only album, The Martyr Mantras (1990). The song also features raggamuffin toaster MC Kinky and received favorable reviews from most music critics. It made the UK Singles Chart in two versions; the "Land of Oz Mix" which peaked at number 80 in 1990 and the "La La Gone Gaga Mix" which peaked at number 35 in 1991. The 1990 version also peaked at number 11 on the US Billboard Hot Dance Club Play chart, while the 1991 version peaked within the top 20 in the Netherlands and the top 30 in Austria and Belgium. British magazine Mixmag ranked "Generations of Love" number 100 in its "100 Greatest Dance Singles Of All Time" list in 1996.  

In 2016, a new version was released by Phunk Investigation with Boy George's vocals, and remixed by Cristian Poow and Tom Novy.

Critical reception
Bill Coleman from Billboard wrote that "if the vocals sound familiar, they should—since track is actually the latest from former pop darling Boy George. Brilliantly conceived deep house jam has already set U.K. dancefloors on fire. Similar results can be expected here." The magazine's Larry Flick felt that "this is arguably among the true, timeless gems of the singer's career, with its politically relevant and emotionally charged lyrics—not to mention its fist-waving performance." Jim Farber from Entertainment Weekly noted that "simultaneously fey and determined, he conveys a tender reassurance and an emphatic strength. Just as emotionally nuanced are the synthesized bass lines that dominate the record." He added that "they create a hypnotic groove, reminiscent of the extended soul tracks pioneered by Isaac Hayes and Curtis Mayfield in the early ’70s." Irish newspaper Evening Herald stated that George is "in splendid voice". Dave Sholin from the Gavin Report wrote that "addressing human injustice with a message of hope and love, Boy George rejuvenates his career thanks to a beautiful melody and a superb singing performance." 

A reviewer from Pakistan's The Herald said that "good old Boy George is back with a new posse and (thankfully) minus the gender-bender hype. Tuneful, energetic with lots going on in the background and up front." Andrew Smith from Melody Maker named it Single of the Week, declaring it as "a brooding, deep blue masterpiece of a song. In feel it's like a mantra; mesmeric and generous, built on shuffling rhythms and repetitious, funky, dubbed-out bass. [...] From the opening marimba flurries to the poignant, percussive fade at the end, "Generations" is a force that's impossible to resist." David Giles from Music Week felt the 1990-version is "reflecting the gentler "vibes" on the dancefloor at present and hinting at the impending reggae influence this summer." Another editor, James Hamilton, described the 1991 remix as a "flamenco/ragga rap" fusion. Upon the release of the 1996 remix, Brad Beatnik gave it four out of five, adding, "Nice, very nice." Phil Cheeseman from Record Mirror found that the song "set the pace for a series of mellow, house-inspired grooves that are just as likely to work in your living room as the club environments they were designed for." Caroline Sullivan from Smash Hits declared it as a "glossy, understated dance tune".

Impact and legacy
British electronic dance and clubbing magazine Mixmag ranked "Generations of Love" number 100 in its "100 Greatest Dance Singles Of All Time" list in 1996, noting that "the gently rolling flamenco guitars and warm Mediterranean vocals saw dance floors turn to slush in its wake."

Music video
The accompanying music video for "Generations of Love" was directed by British music video and film director Baillie Walsh.

An uncensored 7-minute short movie named "Generations of Love" was also made by the band. It features Boy George, Talullah and Leigh Bowery. The film was shot in and around Soho, London, and was produced to promote the single. The short film gives an intriguing snapshot into London’s Soho nightlife during 1990 (still hungover from the late-1980s) by way of capturing the bustling local outdoor streets, and the inside of long-gone amusement arcades and porn cinemas. Talullah, in a wig, plays the role of a straight office-type punter, looking for a quick trick, who ends up pulling a transvestite hooker. They visit a Soho dark porn cinema, where business is dealt. Boy George appears in the film briefly in drag and as himself. The movie has a classic early Andy Warholesque feel to it.

Track listing

 12", UK (1990)
A. "Generations of Love" (Land Of Oz 12" Mix) – 7:05
B.	"Generations of Love" (Future Dub) – 5:34

 12" - Remix, UK (1990)
A. "Generations of Love" (The 70's Mix) – 6:09
B1. "Generations of Love" (The Jazz Mix) – 6:08
B2. "Generations of Love" (The Ambient Mix) – 5:58

 CD single, UK (1990)
"Generations of Love" (Land Of Oz 7" Mix) – 4:58
"Generations of Love" (Land Of Oz 12" Mix) – 7:15
"Generations of Love" (The 80's Mix) – 7:47

 7" single, UK (1991)
A. "Generations of Love" (La La Gone Gaga Mix)
B. "Generations of Love" (Land Of Oz 7" Mix)

 12" vinyl, UK (1991)
A. "Generations of Love" (Totally Outed Mix)
B1. "Generations of Love" (90's Corporeal Mix)
B2. "Generations of Love" (Land Of Oz 12" Mix)

 CD single, Europe (1991)
"Generations of Love" (La La Gone Gaga Mix) – 3:59
"Generations of Love" (Totally Outed Mix) – 7:04
"Generations of Love" (Bodhisattva Mix) – 6:11

 12", UK (1996)
A1. "Generations of Love" (Cheap Spanish Wine Vocal Mix)
A2. "Generations of Love" (Can't Una Copa Dub)
AA1. "Generations of Love" (Disco Rumproller)
AA2. "Generations of Love" (Soho Sleaze)
AA3. "Generations of Love" (Mother's Leftovers)

 CD maxi-single, Sweden (1997)
"Generations of Love" (Cheap Spanish Wine Vocal Mix)
"Generations of Love" (Can't Una Copa Dub)
"Generations of Love" (Disco Rumproller)
"Generations of Love" (Soho Sleaze)
"Generations of Love" (Mother's Leftovers)

 CD maxi-single, Germany (1998)
"Generations of Love" (Scream Radio Mix) – 4:26
"Generations of Love" (La La Gone Gaga Mix) – 3:58
"Generations of Love" (De-Phazz Radio Mix) – 3:38
"Generations of Love" (Dharma Bums Vocal Mix) – 6:43
"Generations of Love" (Mothers Vocal Mix) – 5:24
"Generations of Love" (Land Of Oz Mix By Paul Oakenfold) – 6:23
"Generations of Love" (Timewriter Bootleg Mix) – 8:49
"Generations of Love" (Andrew Wooden Remix) – 6:51
"Generations of Love" (Airscape Sensation Mix) – 5:12
"Generations of Love" (De-Phazz Dub Mix) – 5:33

Charts

Weekly charts

Year-end charts

References

1990 singles
1991 singles
1990 songs
Electro songs
British dance songs
Songs written by Boy George
Boy George songs
MC Kinky songs